Maravilla station is an at-grade light rail station on the L Line of the Los Angeles Metro Rail system. It is located at the intersection of 3rd Street and Ford Boulevard in East Los Angeles, California near Interstate 710. This station opened in 2009 as part of the Gold Line Eastside Extension. This station and all the other Eastside Extension stations will be part of the E Line upon completion of the Regional Connector project in 2023.

Service

Station layout 
Maravilla station utilizes a simple island platform setup with two tracks in the median of East 3rd Street. There are two ramps for platform access, one at the intersection with South Ford Boulevard and the other at the intersection with South McDonnell Avenue.

Hours and frequency

Connections 
, the following connections are available:
 Los Angeles Metro Bus: 
 El Sol: Union Pacific/Salazar Park, Whittier Blvd/Saybrook
 Montebello Transit: 40

References

External links 

Official Eastside Extension page LACMTA

L Line (Los Angeles Metro) stations
Eastside Los Angeles
Railway stations in the United States opened in 2009